Simon Colyn (born March 23, 2002) is a Canadian soccer player who plays for Jong PSV.

Career
Colyn signed with Vancouver Whitecaps FC on April 19, 2018. He made his debut on Vancouver's final game of the 2018 MLS season on October 28, as a substitute for Alphonso Davies in the 86th minute of a 2–1 victory over the Portland Timbers.

On November 19, 2019, it was announced that Colyn would be joining Dutch club PSV for a 10-day training stint.

On October 7, 2020, Colyn joined Italian Serie B side SPAL on loan until June 2021, with an option for the club to make the deal permanent.

On  August 27, 2021, Colyn joined Dutch Eerste Divisie side Jong PSV, the reserve team of PSV Eindhoven, on loan until June 2022, with an option to buy. He made his debut on September 13, subbing in for Jong PSV in a 2–1 defeat to Utrecht. He scored his first goal for the club on December 6 against De Graafschap. He signed a permanent deal with the club on July 20, 2022, penning a two-year contract.

International career
Colyn was called up to a U-15 youth identification camp for Canada in 2017 under coach Rob Gale. For the CONCACAF Under-17 Championship, Colyn was named the captain for Canada and helped the team qualify for the 2019 FIFA U-17 World Cup.

Personal life
Colyn is of Dutch descent through his parents, and holds a dual-citizenship with Canada and the Netherlands.

References

External links
Vancouver Whitecaps FC profile

2002 births
Living people
People from Langley, British Columbia (district municipality)
Canadian soccer players
Canada men's youth international soccer players
Canadian people of Dutch descent
Major League Soccer players
Vancouver Whitecaps FC players
Association football midfielders
Soccer people from British Columbia
Homegrown Players (MLS)
S.P.A.L. players
Jong PSV players
Eerste Divisie players
Canadian expatriate soccer players
Expatriate footballers in Italy
Canadian expatriate sportspeople in Italy
Expatriate footballers in the Netherlands
Canadian expatriate sportspeople in the Netherlands
21st-century Canadian people